The Distinguished Flying Cross may refer to: 

Distinguished Flying Cross (United Kingdom), including Commonwealth countries
Distinguished Flying Cross (United States)